Hard Bounty is a 1995 American Western film.

Synopsis
Martin Kanning is a former Texas Ranger turned bounty hunter. Kanning is a man of honor but when his latest bounty turns out to be innocent, he gives up bounty hunting and buys the saloon. One day a man he knows Carver shows up. It seems like he and Carver have some bad history. Carver hooks up with one of the girls and kills her. After Carver leaves, the girl is found. Donnie, Kanning's girl, says that Carver did it but the Sheriff doesn't want to do anything. So she and some other girls ride out to find Carver. Kanning follows them. Carver learning of them sends some men to get them before they show up where he is.

Cast
Matt McCoy
Kelly Le Brock

External links

1995 films
Films directed by Jim Wynorski
American Western (genre) films
1995 Western (genre) films
1990s English-language films
1990s American films